The Minister for Commonwealth Games Delivery is the minister responsible for the organisation, implementation, and the delivery of the 2026 Commonwealth Games for the Victorian Government. The individual who holds this office directs the government’s approach to delivering the 2026 Commonwealth Games through the organising committee, Commonwealth Games Australia, and other government agencies. Since the introduction of the Ministry by the Andrews government in June 2022, the position has been held by Jacinta Allan.

Purpose 
The ministerial position was formed in June 2022 after the successful bid by the Victorian Government to host the 2026 Commonwealth Games. The position was formed to "lead the delivery of the Commonwealth Games in regional Victoria, and to manage venues, services, logistics, partnerships, media, broadcasting, and communications."

List of Ministers for Commonwealth Games Delivery

References 

Ministers of the Victoria (Australia) state government